State Highway 309 (SH 309) is a Texas state highway that runs from Kerens south to U.S. Highway 287 near the Richland-Chambers Reservoir.  This route was designated on February 20. 1939 along its current path, which extended another mile to the south. On March 29, 1990, SH 309 was rerouted in Kerens along Senter Avenue rather than Fourth Street and Colket Avenue. This section, from the new route of US 287 south to the old location of US 287, was removed on November 29, 1990, as portions of the route and US 287 were submerged by the newly impounded Richland Chambers Reservoir.

Route description
It heads northwest from this junction to an intersection with FM 635. The highway continues to the northwest to an intersection with FM 1393. Heading towards the northwest, the highway continues to an intersection with FM 3096 in Kerens. SH 309 reaches its northern terminus at SH 31 in Kerens.

Junction list

References

309
Transportation in Navarro County, Texas